Insulin-like growth factor binding protein, acid labile subunit, also known as IGFALS, is a protein which in humans is encoded by the IGFALS  gene.

Function 

The protein encoded by this gene is a serum protein that binds insulin-like growth factors, increasing their half-life and their vascular localization. Production of the encoded protein, which contains twenty leucine-rich repeats, is stimulated by growth hormone. Three transcript variants encoding two different isoforms have been found for this gene.

Clinical significance 

Defects in this gene are a cause of acid-labile subunit deficiency, which manifests itself in a delayed and slow puberty.

Interactions 

IGFALS has been shown to interact with IGFBP3.

References

Further reading